The Australian Measles Control Campaign was initiated in August 1998 as part of the World Health Organization's global measles eradication program, and in response to major epidemics in Australia throughout 1994/95, together with a report predicting another impending measles epidemic in Australia. The campaign vaccinated 1.78 million children, making it the largest national vaccination campaign conducted in Australia since the introduction of poliomyelitis vaccination in 1956.

The campaign was promoted using the slogan "Let's Work Together to Beat Measles".


The campaign
Following the World Health Organization's adoption of a 2010 target date for Global Measles eradication and the notation that a single dose vaccination strategy was ineffective, the Federal Health Department began investigating the options for a measles elimination campaign in Australia. In 1996 and 1997, serosurveys were conducted in South Australia and New South Wales to assess the current levels of measles immunity. Results indicated that there were "probably enough susceptible children in the South Australian population to support a measles epidemic". In November 1997, a workshop of experts was formed to discuss the logistical, funding and surveillance issues of a potential measles elimination campaign. The group concluded that the second dose of MMR should be brought forward from 12 years to 4 years (in line with WHO recommendations), and that a school-based campaign be implemented. Three groups would be targeted for vaccination:
 Primary School children (5–12 yrs): This group would be offered vaccination at school-based clinics, to be provided by two Registered Nurses per school.
 Pre-school children (1–4 yrs): Letters would be sent to the parents of all children who were overdue for their first dose of MMR, encouraging them to attend their GP for vaccination.
 High-School children (12–18 yrs): A letter would be sent to all parents encouraging them to ensure their children had received two doses of MMR.

Objectives
 Cease measles-related morbidity and mortality, by interrupting indigenous transmission of measles
 Prevent reintroduction of measles until global eradication is achieved, by maintaining uniformly low levels of population susceptibility

Statistics

 1.7 million primary-school aged children vaccinated, representing 96% of children in this age group.
 800,000 pre-school children vaccinated.
 89 total adverse events (33% of which were fainting) representing 5.24 total adverse events per 100,000 doses.
 Prevented an estimated 17,500 cases of measles.
 Prevented an estimated 8 measles-related fatalities.
 Total cost of the campaign was A$30,841,356.

Results
 Increase in measles immunity for 1–18 year-olds from 85% to 90%, and 6–12 year-olds (the target age group) from 84% to 96% (Assessed by serosurvey).
 Increase in Rubella immunity in 1–18 year-olds from 83% to 91% (assessed by serosurvey).
 96% fall in reported measles cases after five years, from 836 in 1997 to 32 in 2001.
 Endemic measles declared eradicated from Australia in February 2009.

References

Vaccination in Australia
Vaccination-related organizations
Measles
Health campaigns